Live from Australia may refer to:
 
Live from Australia (Roy Orbison album)
Live from Australia (The Tea Party album)
Live from Australia, album from Cheap Trick discography 2001
Live from Australia, album from Matchbox Twenty discography
Live from Australia, album by Eddie Ifft 2009

See also
Live in Australia (disambiguation)